Piedras (English: Stones) is a 2002 Spanish film directed by Ramón Salazar. It revolves around the lives of five women living in Madrid.

Cast
 Antonia San Juan as Adela
 Ángela Molina as Isabel
 Najwa Nimri as Leire
 Vicky Peña as Maricarmen
 Lola Dueñas as Daniela
 Mónica Cervera as Anita
 María Casal as Martina
 Enrique Alcides as Joaquín
 Daniele Liotti as Kun
 Pablo Puyol as Entrenador

External links

Spanish drama films
2000s Spanish-language films
2002 films
2000s Spanish films